Jonah Ethan Blechman (born February 8, 1975) is an American actor. He has appeared in This Boy's Life with Leonardo DiCaprio and stars in Another Gay Movie alongside Jonathan Chase and Michael Carbonaro and the sequel Another Gay Sequel: Gays Gone Wild!.

Following the release of Another Gay Movie, Blechman came out as gay.

Television
Empty Cradle as Patrick
The Commish (episode "The Kid") as Mikey Colyer
Walker, Texas Ranger (episodes "Whitewater: Part 1" & "Whitewater: Part 2") as Damian Cheever
Seduced by Madness (episodes "1.1" & "1.2") as Josh Yanke
The Rockford Files as Tennison Keats
Dawson's Creek (episode "Four Scary Stories") as Tad

Film
This Boy's Life as Arthur Gayle
Fall Time as Joe
Treasure Island as The Body
$pent as Scott
Beyond the Pale as Dylan
Luster as Billy
Another Gay Movie as Nico
Arc as Kenny
Another Gay Sequel: Gays Gone Wild! as Nico
Swan Song as Tristan

References

External links

1975 births
American male film actors
American male television actors
Living people
American gay actors
People from San Mateo County, California